Tomas "Tom" Godal (born 6 July 1953) is a Norwegian former motorcycle speedway rider who rode in Britain for Halifax Dukes and Leicester Lions.

Born in Notodden, Godal gained his early experience in Norway, and finished fourth in the Norwegian Championship in 1975. In 1977 he signed for Halifax Dukes, moving on to Leicester Lions in April 1978. Never averaging above 5 points in  a season, his last year in British speedway was 1979.

References

1953 births
Living people
Norwegian speedway riders
Halifax Dukes riders
Leicester Lions riders
People from Notodden
Sportspeople from Vestfold og Telemark